The 1926 Southern Conference football season was the college football games played by the member schools of the Southern Conference as part of the 1926 college football season. The season began on September 18.

In the annual Rose Bowl game, the SoCon champion Alabama Crimson Tide tied the PCC champion, and #1 ranked team under the Dickinson System, Stanford 7–7. Alabama and Stanford therefore were amongst those named a national champion. Alabama guard Fred Pickhard was the Rose Bowl game's MVP.

Robert Neyland was hired to coach Tennessee in 1926 by Nathan Dougherty with the explicit goal to "even the score with Vanderbilt."

Season overview

Results and team statistics

Key

PPG = Average of points scored per game
PAG = Average of points allowed per game

Regular season

SoCon teams in bold.

Week One

Week Two

Week Three

Week Four

Week Five

Week Six

Week Seven

Week Eight

Week Nine

Week Ten

Week Eleven

Postseason

Bowl games

Awards and honors

All-Americans

E – Hoyt Winslett, Alabama (AP-1; INS; NEA; CP-2; NYS-2; BE-1; RWJ-2; DW-1; ES-2; BEHR)
T – Fred Pickhard, Alabama (BE-2; BEHR)
T – Mack Tharpe, Georgia Tech (BEHR)
G – John Barnhill, Tennessee (BEHR)
C – Vernon Sharpe, Vanderbilt (BEHR)
QB – Bill Spears, Vanderbilt (AP-2; NYS-2; BE-2; RWJ-3 [as hb]; DW-2; BEHR)
HB – Tolbert "Red" Brown, Alabama (BEHR)
FB – Ty Rauber, Washington & Lee (AP-3; BEHR)

All-Southern team

The following is the composite All-Southern team compiled by the Associated Press.

References